The Joint University Council of Applied Social Sciences (JUC) is the UK learned society for public and social administration. The JUC was founded at a meeting at London School of Economics in 1918. A complete history of the JUC was written by Professor Richard Chapman in 2007.

As a representative body, the JUC is composed of institutional members from across Higher Education. It is constituted of three sub-committees: the JUC Executive Committee, the Public Administration Committee (PAC) and the Social Work Education Committee (SWEC).

JUC Executive Committee 

The JUC Executive Committee is constituted of the trustees of the learned society. This includes representatives from both PAC and SWEC as well as the JUC Treasurer, JUC Secretary, JUC Chair and JUC Vice-Chair.

Former JUC Chairs 
2014-2017       Professor Joyce Liddle

2017-2021		Professor Samantha Baron

2021-Present    Dr Ian C. Elliott

Public Administration Committee 

The Public Administration Committee (PAC) represents scholarship in public administration and public management within the UK. The PAC publish two academic journals in association with Sage: Public Policy and Administration and Teaching Public Administration.

As well as publishing two academic journals the PAC provides funding for small research projects and seminars series.

Former PAC Chairs 
1977-1981		Professor Richard Chapman

1981-1983		Professor Howard Elcock

1984-1986		Professor Chris Bellamy

1996-1998		Professor Rod Rhodes

1999-2002		Professor Andrew Gray

2002-2004		Professor Grant Jordan

2005-2007		Professor Barry O’Toole

2008-2010		Professor Martin Laffin

2011-2013		Professor Joyce Liddle

2014-2016		Professor Kerry Howell

2017–2021		Dr Ian C. Elliott

2021-present    Dr Karin Bottom

Social Work Education Committee 

The Social Work Education Committee (SWEC) represents UK schools of social work at an international level. Previously SWEC have been involved in reviews of social work in England and Scotland. SWEC are routinely consulted by national bodies including regulatory and research councils and government departments on issues surrounding social work education and research. They work closely with a wide range of national and international social work bodies such as Social Work England, the Social Care Institute for Excellence (SCIE), the European Social Work Research Association (ESWRA) and the International Federation of Social Work (IFSW) and the International Association of Schools of Social Work (IASSW).

Fellows
The JUC may confer the honorary title of Fellow of the JUC on academics within public and social administration who are held in high esteem by their peers and who have made an outstanding contribution to the learned society. They are nominated and the nominations are then subject to peer review. Fellows are entitled to use the letters "FJUC" after their name.

The full list of JUC Fellows are as follows:

 Professor Peter Kaim-Caudle 
 Professor A T Collis 
 David Gladstone
 Professor Sonia Jackson
 S R Pierce
 Professor Joan Orme
 Professor A Dunsire
 Mr Ivor Shelley OBE	
 Professor Richard Chapman 
 Professor H Elcock
 Professor Gavin Drewry
 Professor Sylvia Horton
 Professor John Veit-Wilson (nominated 2003) 
 Professor C Bellamy (nominated 2003)
 Professor Adrian Sinfield (nominated 2004) 
 Jackie Powell (nominated 2009) 
 Professor Peter Barberis (nominated 2009) 
 Michael Preston-Shoot (nominated 2010) 
 Professor Jonathan Parker (nominated 2011) 
 Professor David Stanley (nominated 2013) 
 Professor Andrew Gray (nominated 2013) 
 Professor Andrew Massey (nominated 2013) 
 Barry O’Toole (nominated 2013) 
 Michael Hunt (nominated 2013) 
 Professor David Wilson (nominated 2014) 
 Professor Martin Laffin (nominated 2014) 
 Professor Hilary Tompsett (nominated 2015) 
 Professor John Diamond (nominated 2017) 
 Professor John Fenwick (nominated 2017) 
 Professor Joyce Liddle (nominated 2017)
 Professor Peter Murphy (nominated 2020)
 Dr Mike Rowe (nominated 2020)
 Professor Paul Carmichael (nominated 2020)
 Professor Claire Dunlop (nominated 2020)
 Professor Edoardo Ongaro (nominated 2020)
 Dr Keith Baker (nominated 2020)

References 

Public administration
Social work organisations in the United Kingdom
Learned societies of the United Kingdom